The 2014 MSBL season was the 26th season of the Men's State Basketball League (SBL). The regular season began on Friday 14 March and ended on Saturday 26 July. The finals began on Friday 1 August and ended on Saturday 30 August, when the East Perth Eagles defeated the Geraldton Buccaneers in the MSBL Grand Final.

Regular season
The regular season began on Friday 14 March and ended on Saturday 26 July after 20 rounds of competition.

Standings

Finals
The finals began on Friday 1 August and ended on Saturday 30 August with the MSBL Grand Final.

Bracket

All-Star Game
The 2014 MSBL All-Star Game took place at the Eaton Recreation Centre on Sunday 7 September, marking the first North v South SBL All-Star event in over a decade.

Rosters

Game data

Awards

Player of the Week

Statistics leaders

Regular season
 Most Valuable Player: Cooper Land (Rockingham Flames)
 Coach of the Year: Mark Utley (Rockingham Flames)
 Most Improved Player: Sunday Dech (East Perth Eagles)
 All-Star Five:
 PG: Kyle Armour (East Perth Eagles)
 SG: Seb Salinas (Joondalup Wolves)
 SF: Stan Okoye (Perth Redbacks)
 PF: Cooper Land (Rockingham Flames)
 C: Jarrad Prue (Lakeside Lightning)

Finals
 Grand Final MVP: Joe-Alan Tupaea (East Perth Eagles)

References

External links
 2014 fixtures
 Men's SBL movements for 2014
 SBL All-Stars vs Wildcats preview
 SBL All-Stars vs Wildcats report
 SBL All-Stars vs Wildcats highlights

2014
2013–14 in Australian basketball
2014–15 in Australian basketball